Ilkineyevo (İlkänäy) is a rural locality (a village) and the administrative centre of Ilkineyevsky Selsoviet, Kuyurgazinsky District, Bashkortostan, Russia. The population was 327 as of 2010. There are 4 streets.

Geography 
Ilkineyevo is located 23 km north of Yermolayevo (the district's administrative centre) by road. Malomusino is the nearest rural locality.

References 

Rural localities in Kuyurgazinsky District